Arno Rossini (born 16 May 1957) is a Swiss football manager, who has managed a number of Swiss clubs. He was most recently the manager of AC Bellinzona. He previously managed FC Sion.

References 

1957 births
Living people
Swiss men's footballers
AC Bellinzona players
Swiss football managers
AC Bellinzona managers
FC Locarno managers
FC Sion managers
Association football defenders